Brett Thompson (born 23 October 1987). He is a South African cricketer who played in the 2006 Under-19 Cricket World Cup for the South Africa in Sri Lanka.

References

External links

1987 births
Living people
South African cricketers
Eastern Province cricketers
21st-century South African people
Place of birth missing (living people)